Khudayberdino (Xoźaybirźin) is a rural locality (a village) in Yalchinsky Selsoviet, Kugarchinsky District, Bashkortostan, Russia. The population was 378 as of 2010. There are 3 streets.

Geography 
Khudayberdino is located 44 km northwest of Mrakovo (the district's administrative centre) by road. Kovalyovka is the nearest rural locality.

References 

Rural localities in Kugarchinsky District